Jean de Bosschère (Uccle, 5 July 1878 – Châteauroux, 17 January 1953) was a Belgian writer and painter.

Early life
Bosschère was born in Uccle, the son of Charles de Bosschere and Nancy Marie Hélène Van der Stock. In 1884, the family moved to Lier, where Jean spent a tormented childhood full of affection for his disfigured sister Marthe, described in Marthe et l'Enragé. In 1893, Jean attended the École d'Horticulture in Ghent. In 1894, the family moved to Antwerp, where Jean attended the Royal Academy of Fine Arts from 1896 to 1900.

Influences
Between 1901 and 1905, he regularly visited Paris where he met writers with a passion for the occult. On 25 March 1905, he married Jeanne Fanny Alexandra Jones; they separated officially in 1923. From 1905 to 1914, he wrote regular articles for the magazine L'Occident and L'Art Flamand et Hollandais. From 1907, he also wrote several monographs, especially on Flemish art. Two years later he published his first collection of poetry, Béâle-Gryne, which he illustrated himself. The style of these illustrations, as well as his later work, was a version of Art Nouveau heavily influenced by the drawings of Aubrey Beardsley. He was also influenced by the Roman Catholic spiritual works of French poet and dramatist Paul Claudel, whom he saw lecture in 1909. That same year, he began a lifelong friendship with the Antwerp Symbolist poet Max Elskamp (of whom in 1914, he published a critical study), and in 1911, of the French writer Andre Suares. Around 1912, he underwent a moral and emotional crisis and distanced himself from Symbolism. He was accused of Satanism in 1912, in response to his first novel, Dolorine et les Ombres (1911). In 1914, he made a trip to Italy.

WWI
In 1915, after the outbreak of World War I, he fled from Belgium and went to London where he met writers such as John Gould Fletcher, Aldous Huxley and D. H. Lawrence, and Imagist poets such as Ezra Pound, T. S. Eliot and Richard Aldington. He met several London publishers for whom he illustrated numerous books in the '20s and '30s. Among the books he illustrated were the poems of Oscar Wilde and Charles Baudelaire.  He also illustrated erotic classics by Aristophanes, Ovid, Strato and Apuleius. In 1920, he moved in with his beloved Vera Anne Hamilton but she died in January 1922. At the end of 1922, he left London with Élisabeth d'Ennetières, with whom he would stay for the rest of his life. They settled in Albano, near Rome. In the winter of 1925–26, they lived in Brussels, then from March 1926, in Paris, where he met Antonin Artaud. They also stayed regularly Solaia near Siena in Italy, where De Bosschere worked on his many novels and poetry collections.

"l'Obscure"
The work of De Bosschere was marked by a persistent spiritual seeking in his life he developed a fascination with the occult, the spiritual, the obscure and the sexual. He gave himself the nickname "Satan" and "l'Obscure", which formed the title of Satan l'Obscure (1933), his second autobiographical novel after Marthe et l'Enragé.

The decade of the '30s was difficult for De Bosschere. He wrote several novels that he regarded as failures and found little illustration work due to the poor economic climate. From 1938 he lived a secluded life in La Châtre in central France. He kept a diary from 1946 titled Journal d'un Rebelle Solitaire that has remained unreleased. He also made two anthologies of most of his poetry: Derniers poèmes de l'Obscure (1948) and Héritiers de l'abime (1950).

Awards and death
In September 1952 he received the Prix de la Méditerranée and in November the Mandat des Poètes. A year later he died at the age of 74 in the hospital in Châteauroux. Following his death several of his works were published, but much of the work, which is kept in the Archives et Musée de la littérature in Brussels, of this prolific writer has remained unpublished.

Selected bibliography

Works in English
 The Closed Door, trans. F. S. Flint.  John Lane: New York, 1917.
 Folk Tales of Flanders (also pub. as Beasts and Men).  London: William Heinemann, 1918.
 The City Curious.  London: William Heinemann, 1920.
 Weird Islands.  London: William Heinemann, 1921.
The Love Books of Ovid. London: John Lane The Bodley Head, 1925 – 24 plates. 
 Marthe and the Madman, trans. Pierre Loving.  New York: Covici-Friede, 1928.
 Peacocks and Other Mysteries, trans. Frederick Street Hoppin.  New York: Edmond Byrne Hackett, 1941.
 The House of Forsaken Hope, trans. Donald MacAndrew (from Satan, l'Obscure).  London: Fortune Press, 1942.

External links
 
 
 

1878 births
1953 deaths
People from Uccle
Belgian painters
Art Nouveau painters
20th-century Belgian novelists
Belgian male novelists
Royal Academy of Fine Arts (Antwerp) alumni
20th-century Belgian poets
Belgian male poets
20th-century Belgian male writers